FD-DEVS (Finite & Deterministic Discrete Event System Specification) is a formalism for modeling and analyzing discrete event dynamic systems in both simulation and verification ways. FD-DEVS also provides modular and hierarchical modeling features which have been inherited from Classic DEVS.

History 
FD-DEVS was originally named as "Schedule-Controllable DEVS" [Hwang05] and designed to support verification analysis of its networks which had been an open problem of DEVS formalism for 30 years. In addition, it was also designated to resolve the so-called "OPNA" problem of SP-DEVS. From the viewpoint of Classic DEVS, FD-DEVS has three restrictions

 finiteness of event sets and state set,
 the lifespan of a state can be scheduled by a rational number or infinity, and
 the internal schedule can be either preserved or updated by an input event.

The third restriction can be also seen as a relaxation from SP-DEVS where the schedule is always preserved by any input events. Due to this relaxation there is no longer OPNA problem, but there is also one limitation that a time-line abstraction which can be used for abstracting elapsed times of SP-DEVS networks is no longer useful for FD-DEVS network [Hwang05]. But another time abstraction method [Dill89] which was invented by Prof. D. Dill can be applicable to obtain a finite-vertex reachability graph for FD-DEVS networks.

Examples

Ping-pong game 

Consider a single ping-pong match in which there are two players. Each player can be modeled by FD-DEVS such that the player model has  an input event ?receive and an output event !send, and it has two states: Send and Wait. Once the player gets into "Send", it will generates "!send" and go back to "Wait" after the sending time which is 0.1 time unit. When staying at "Wait" and if it gets "?receive", it changes into "Send" again. In other words, the player model stays at "Wait" forever unless it gets "?receive".

To make a complete ping-pong match, one player starts as an offender whose initial state is "Send" and the other starts as a defender whose initial state is "Wait". Thus in Fig. 1. Player A is the initial offender and Player B is the initial defender. In addition, to make the game continue, each player's "?send" event should be coupled to the other player's "?receive" as shown in Fig. 1.

Two-slot toaster 

Consider a toaster in which there are two slots that have their own start knobs as shown in Fig. 2(a). Each slot has the identical functionality except their toasting time. Initially, the knob is not pushed, but if one pushes the knob, the associated slot starts toasting for its toasting time: 20 seconds for the left slot, 40 seconds for the right slot. After the toasting time, each slot and its knobs pop up. Notice that even though one tries to push a knob when its associated slot is toasting, nothing happens.

One can model it with FD-DEVS as shown in Fig. 2(b). Two slots are modeled as atomic FD-DEVS  whose input event is "?push" and output event is "!pop", states are "Idle" (I) and "Toast" (T) with the initial state is "idle". When it is "Idle" and receives "?push" (because one pushes the knob), its state changes to "Toast". In other words, it stays at "Idle" forever unless it receives "?push" event. 20 (res. 40) seconds later the left (res. right) slot returns to "Idle".

Atomic FD-DEVS

Formal Definition 

where
  is a finite set of input events;
  is a finite set of output events;
  is a finite set of states;
  is the initial state;
  is the time advance function which defines the lifespan of a state where   is the set of non-negative rational numbers plus infinity.
  is the external transition function which defines how an input event changes the schedule as well as a state of the system. The internal schedule of a state  is updated by  if , otherwise(i.e.), the schedule is preserved.
  is the output and internal transition function where  and  denotes the silent event. The output and internal transition function defines how a state generates an output event, at the same time, how the state changes internally.

Formal Representation of Ping-Pong Player
The formal representation of the player in the ping-pong example shown in Fig. 1 can be given as follows.  where ={?receive}; ={!send}; ={Send, Wait}; =Send for Player A, Wait for Player B;  (Send)=0.1,(Wait)=; (Wait,?receive)=(Send,1), (Send,?receive)=(Send,0); (Send)=(!send, Wait), (Wait)=(Wait).

Formal Representation of One Slot Toaster
The formal representation of the slot of Two-slot Toaster Fig. 2(a) and (b) can be given as follows.  where ={?push}; ={!pop}; ={I, T}; =I;  (T)=20 for the left slot, 40 for the right slot, (I)=; (I, ?push)=(T,1), (T,?push)=(T,0); (T)=(!pop, I), (I)=(I).

Formal Representation of Crosswalk Light Controller
As mentioned above, FD-DEVS is an relaxation of SP-DEVS. That means, FD-DEVS is a supper class of SP-DEVS. We would give a model of FD-DEVS of a crosswalk light controller which is used for SP-DEVS in this Wikipedia.  where ={?p}; ={!g:0, !g:1, !w:0, !w:1}; ={BG, BW, G, GR, R, W, D}; =BG, (BG)=0.5,(BW)=0.5, (G)=30, (GR)=30,(R)=2, (W)=26, (D)=2; (G,?p)=(GR,0), (s,?p)=(s,0) if s G; (BG)=(!g:1, BW), (BW)=(!w:0, G),(G)=(G), (GR)=(!g:0, R), (R)=(!w:1, W), (W)=(!w:0, D), (D)=(!g:1, G);

Behaviors of FD-DEVS Models 

 FD-DEVS is a sub-class of DEVS
A FD-DEVS model,  is DEVS  where
 
 
 Given a state ,  
 Given a state  and an input event ,

 Given a state ,   if 
 Given a state ,   if 

For details of DEVS behavior, the readers can refer to Behavior of Atomic DEVS
Behavior of Ping-Pong Player A

Fig. 3. shows an event segment (top) and the associated state trajectory (bottom) of Player A who plays the ping-pong game introduced in Fig. 1. In Fig. 3. the status of Player A is described as (state, lifespan, elapsed time)=() and the line segment of the bottom of Fig. 3. denotes the value of the elapsed time. After changing into (Wait, inf, 0) when  is reset by 0, Player A doesn't know when  becomes 0 again. However, since Player B sends back the ball to Player A 0.1 second later, Player A gets back to (Send, 0.1 0) at time 0.2. From that time, 0.1 seconds later when Player A's status becomes (Send, 0.1, 0.1), Player A sends back the ball to Player B and gets into (Wait, inf, 0). Thus, this cyclic state transitions which move "Send" to "Wait" back and forth will go forever.

Behavior of a Toaster
Fig. 4. shows an event segment (top) and the associated state trajectory (bottom) of the left slot of the two-slot toaster introduced in Fig. 2. Like Fig.3, the status of the left slot is described as (state, lifespan, elapsed time)=() in Fig. 4. Since the initial state of the toaster is "I" and its lifetime is infinity, the height of (Wait, inf) can be determined by when ?push occurs. Fig. 4. illustrates the case ?push happens at time 40 and the toaster changes into (T, 20, 0). From that time, 20 seconds later when its status becomes (T, 20, 20), the toaster gets back to (Wait, inf, 0) where we don't know when it gets back to "Toast" again. Fig. 4. shows the case that ?push occurs at time 90 so the toaster get into (T,20,0). Notice that even though there someone push again at time 97, that status (T, 20, 7) doesn't change at all because (T,?push)=(T,1).

Advantages

Applicability of Time-Zone Abstraction 
The property of non-negative rational-valued lifespans which can be preserved or changed by input events along with finite numbers of states and events guarantees that the behavior of FD-DEVS networks can be abstracted as an equivalent finite-vertex reachability graph by abstracting the infinitely-many values of the elapsed times using the time abstracting technique introduced by Prof. D. Dill [Dill89]. An algorithm generating a finite-vertex reachability graph (RG)has been introduced in [HZ06a], [HZ07].

Reachability Graph 
Fig. 5. shows the reachability graph of two-slot toaster which was shown in Fig. 2. In the reachability graph, each vertex has its own discrete state and time zone which are ranges of 
Each directed arch shows how its source vertex changes into the destination vertex along with an associated event and a set of reset models. For example, the transition arc (6) to (5) is triggered by push1 event. For more detailed information, the reader can refer to [HZ07].

Decidability of Safety 
As a qualitative property, safety of a FD-DEVS network is decidable by (1) generating RG of the given network and (2) checking whether some bad states are reachable or not [HZ06b].

Decidability of Liveness 
As a qualitative property, liveness of a FD-DEVS network is decidable by (1) generating RG of the given network, (2) from RG, generating kernel directed acyclic graph (KDAG) in which a vertex is strongly connected component, and (3) checking if a vertex of KDAG contains a state transition cycle which contains a set of liveness states[HZ06b].

Disadvantages

Weak Expressiveness for describing nondeterminism 

The features that all characteristic functions, of FD-DEVS are deterministic can be seen as somehow a limitation to model the system that has non-deterministic behaviors. For example, if a player of the ping-pong game shown in Fig. 1. has a stochastic lifespan at "Send" state, FD-DEVS doesn't capture the non-determinism effectively.

Tool

For Verification 
There are two open source libraries DEVS# written in C# at http://xsy-csharp.sourceforge.net/DEVSsharp/ and XSY written in Python at https://code.google.com/p/x-s-y/ that support some reachability graph-based verification algorithms for finding safeness and liveness.

For Simulation via XML 
For standardization of DEVS, especially using FDDEVS, Dr. Saurabh Mittal together with co-workers has worked on defining of XML format of FDDEVS. We can find an article at http://www.duniptechnologies.com/research/xfddevs/. This standard XML format was used for UML execution [RCMZ09] .

Footnotes

References 
 [Dill89] D.L. Dill, "Timing Assumptions and Verification of Finite-State Concurrent Systems", In Proceedings of the Workshop on Computer Aided Verification Methods for Finite State Systems, pp 197-212, Grenoble, France, 1989
 [Hwang05] M.H. Hwang, "Generating Finite-State Global Behavior of Reconfigurable Automation Systems: DEVS Approach", Proceedings of 2005 IEEE-CASE, Edmonton, Canada, Aug. 1-2, 2005(Available at http://moonho.hwang.googlepages.com/publications)
 [HZ06a] M. H. Hwang  and Bernard Zeigler, "A Modular Verification Framework using Finite and Deterministic  DEVS",  Proceedings of 2006 DEVS Symposium, pp57-65, Huntsville, Alabama, USA, (Available at http://www.acims.arizona.edu )
 [HZ06b] M. H. Hwang and Bernard Zeigler, "A Reachable Graph  of Finite and Deterministic  DEVS Networks", Proceedings of 2006 DEVS Symposium, pp48-56, Huntsville, Alabama, USA, (Available at http://www.acims.arizona.edu )
 [HZ07] M.H. Hwang and Bernard Zeigler, "Reachability Graph of Finite & Deterministic DEVS", IEEE Transactions on Automation Science and Engineering,Volume 6, Issue 3, 2009, pp. 454–467, http://ieeexplore.ieee.org/xpl/freeabs_all.jsp?isnumber=5153598&arnumber=5071137&count=19&index=7
 [RCMZ09] José L. Risco-Martín, Jesús M. de la Cruz, Saurabh Mittal  and Bernard Zeigler, "eUDEVS: Executable UML with DEVS Theory of Modeling and Simulation", SIMULATION, Transaction of The Society for Modeling and Simulation International,Volume 85, No. 11-12, 2009, pp. 750–777, http://sim.sagepub.com/content/85/11-12/750.short
 [ZKP00] 

Automata (computation)